Daniel Valenzuela (born November 30, 1982) is a Mexican professional boxer.

Professional career
In May 2010 Valenzuela fought Miguel Roman for the vacant WBC FECOMBOX Super Featherweight title, the fight was on Mexico Cadena 3.

On September 12, 2009 he lost to Brandon Rios in El Palenque de la Feria, Tepic, Nayarit, Mexico.

References

External links

Boxers from Sonora
Lightweight boxers
1982 births
Living people
Mexican male boxers
Sportspeople from Hermosillo
21st-century Mexican people